Begin the Beguine is a studio album by Julio Iglesias, released in 1981 on CBS.

Track listing

Charts

Certifications

References 

2007 albums
Julio Iglesias albums
Columbia Records albums